Milwaukee Banks are an electronic hip-hop duo from Melbourne, Australia. The members are Edo (producer) and Dyl Thomas (vocals).They emerged in late 2013 with the release of their first song, Pluto Bounce, which premiered on Interview Magazine

In June 2014, Milwaukee Banks released their debut EP, The Rose Water. This was followed up with a remix EP, featuring remixes by Australian artists of all the songs from Rose Water.

In late 2014, they released a pair of collaborative tracks, produced by Australian artists Andrei Eremin and Rat & Co.

In 2014, the group was nominated for Best Emerging Artist in the Music Victoria Awards of 2014.
In 2015, Milwaukee Banks won a competition through Triple J Unearthed to perform at the St. Jeromes Laneway Festival.

In March 2016, Milwaukee Banks released their debut album, Deep into the Night.

Discography

Studio albums

Extended plays

Singles

Awards and nominations

AIR Awards
The Australian Independent Record Awards (commonly known informally as AIR Awards) is an annual awards night to recognise, promote and celebrate the success of Australia's Independent Music sector.

|-
| AIR Awards of 2017
| Deep into the Night
| Best Independent Hip Hop/Urban Album
| 
|-
| AIR Awards of 2019
| No Time
| Best Independent Hip Hop/Urban Album
| 
|-

Music Victoria Awards
The Music Victoria Awards are an annual awards night celebrating Victorian music.

|-
| Music Victoria Awards of 2014
| themselves
| Best Emerging Artist
| 
|-

References 

Australian hip hop groups
Victoria (Australia) musical groups
Musical groups established in 2013
2013 establishments in Australia